The State Labour and Social Services Inspectorate (ISHPSHS) is a government agency in Albania tasked to ensure the implementation of legal provisions on working conditions of employees, in the exercise of their profession, duration of work, salaries, insurance, hygiene, welfare, employment of minors, juveniles, women and other labour related issues.

References

Inspectorate
Inspectorate